Districts under Tajikistan Central Government Jurisdiction or Republic Subordination, formerly called Karotegin Province, is a region in Tajikistan, consisting of 9 districts and 4 district-level cities that are directly under central administration. Dushanbe, the capital of Tajikistan, is surrounded by the Districts under Central Government Jurisdiction, but not part of it. The region covers an area of 28,500 square kilometres, and has a total population of 2,165,900 (2020), The Districts' ethnic composition in 2010 was 85% Tajik and 11.7% Uzbek.

History
The Districts under Central Government Jurisdiction cover much of the territory of the former Gharm Oblast which was dissolved in 1955. They were formerly known as Karotegin Region.

Districts
The Districts under Central Government Jurisdiction cover 9 districts. The districts are:
Fayzobod District
Lakhsh District (formerly Jirgatol District)
Nurobod District (formerly Darband District)
Rasht District (formerly Gharm District)
Rudaki District (formerly Leninskiy District)
Sangvor District (formerly Tavildara District)
Shahrinav District (formerly Qaratogh District)
Tojikobod District (formerly Qalai Labi Ob District)
Varzob District

District cities 

 Vahdat (formerly Kofarnihon)
 Tursunzoda (formerly Regar)
 Hisor
 Roghun

Geography
The plateau is traversed by the river Vakhsh, a right-hand tributary of the Amu Darya. On the northern border run the Gissar and Zeravshan mountains, and on the southern border the Darvaz range . The winter climate is extremely severe: snow begins to fall in October and it is May before it disappears. During the warmer months, however, the mountainsides are richly clothed with the foliage of maple, mountain ash, apple, pear and walnut trees; the orchards furnish not only apples and pears, but peaches, cherries, mulberries and apricots. Both cattle and horses are of a small and hardy breed.

Demographics

Culture
Mausoleum of Hodja Nashron

References

 
Subdivisions of Tajikistan